Big Beautiful Sky is an album by Venus Hum, released on April 1, 2003 through MCA.

Track listing
"Hummingbirds"
"Montana"
"Soul Sloshing"
"Wordless May"
"Alice"
"Lumberjacks"
"Beautiful Spain" 	  	
"The Bells"	
"Springtime #2" 	  	
"Honey"  	
"Sonic Boom"	  	
"Bella Luna"

Personnel
Kip Kubin- Computers and synthesizers
Tony Miracle- Computers and synthesizers, guitars, bass guitars, vocals, String arrangement
Annette Strean- vocals, Lyrics
Steve Fitzmaurice- Mixing
Mike Marsh- Mastering
Sean O'Hagan - String arrangement on "Alice", "Bella Luna" and "The Bells"
Marcus Holdaway- String arrangement, Cello
Jackie Norrie- Violin
Sally Herbert- Violin
Brian Wright- Viola
Jacob Lawson- Violin, Viola
Julie Adams- Cello
Christopher Moon- Snare drum
Merton Gauster- Photography

References

Venus Hum albums
2003 albums